Thomas R. Marshall House, also known as the Whitley County Historical Museum, is a historic home located at Columbia City, Whitley County, Indiana. It was built in 1874, and is a two-story, "L"-plan, frame dwelling.  It was remodeled in 1895.  It features a nearly full-with front porch supported by paired Doric order columns and a projecting two-story bay.  It was the home of Indiana Governor and U.S. Vice President Thomas R. Marshall.

It was listed on the National Register of Historic Places in 1983.

References

External links
Whitley County Historical Museum website

History museums in Indiana
Houses on the National Register of Historic Places in Indiana
Houses completed in 1874
National Register of Historic Places in Whitley County, Indiana
Museums in Whitley County, Indiana
Historic house museums in Indiana
Governor of Indiana